Kalimpong Assembly constituency is an assembly constituency in Kalimpong district in the Indian state of West Bengal.

Overview
As per orders of the Delimitation Commission, No. 22 Kalimpong Assembly constituency covers Kalimpong municipality, Kalimpong I community development block, Kalimpong II community development block, and Gorubathan community development block.

Kalimpong Assembly constituency is part of No. 4 Darjeeling (Lok Sabha constituency).

Members of Legislative Assembly

Election results

2021 Election

In the 2021 West Bengal Legislative Assembly election, Ruden Sada Lepcha of GJM (Binay faction) defeated his nearest rival Suva Pradhan of BJP.

2016 Election

In the 2016 West Bengal Legislative Assembly election, Sarita Rai of GJM defeated her nearest rival Harka Bahadur Chhetri of JAP.

2011 Election

In the 2011 West Bengal Legislative Assembly election, Harka Bahadur Chhetri of GJM defeated his nearest rival Prakash Dahal of GNLF.

References

Assembly constituencies of West Bengal
Kalimpong district